Luís Filipe de Castro Mendes  (born 21 November 1950) is a Portuguese politician who served as Minister of Culture from 14 April 2016 to 15 October 2018. Mendes graduated from the University of Lisbon with a law degree. He served as the Portuguese ambassador to Budapest from 2003 to 2007, and as the ambassador to New Delhi from 2007 to 2009.

Distinctions

National orders
 Grand Officer of the Order of Prince Henry the Navigator (18 March 1986)
 Commander of the Order of Merit (12 September 1991)
 Grand Cross of the Order of Merit (28 January 2003)

Foreign orders
 Honorary Knight Commander of the Royal Victorian Order of the United Kingdom (7 March 1986)
 Commander of the Order of Rio Branco of Brazil (25 July 1996)

References

1950 births
Ambassadors of Portugal to Hungary
Ambassadors of Portugal to India
Culture ministers of Portugal
Grand Officers of the Order of Prince Henry
Living people
People from Idanha-a-Nova
Portuguese male poets
Portuguese politicians